Mark Mikhaylovich Gurman (born 9 February 1989 in Alma-Ata) is a Kazakhstani professional association football player who currently plays for Kyzylzhar and the Kazakhstan national team.

Club career
Gurman made aliyah at the age of fourteen without his parents. He was scouted by Shlomo Scharf who brought him to Israel as part of a project for young Jews to make aliyah without their parents.

Gurman left FC Kairat in November 2015 after four seasons with the club. In February 2016, Gurman signed for Champions FC Astana.

On 31 January 2018, Kaisar announced the signing of Gurman on a one-year contract.

Career statistics

Club

International

Statistics accurate as of match played 13 October 2015

Honours 
Astana
 Kazakhstan Cup (1): 2010

Kairat
 Kazakhstan Cup (1): 2014

Kaisar
 Kazakhstan Cup (1): 2019

References

External links
 

1989 births
Living people
Soviet Jews
Kazakhstani Jews
Jewish footballers
Kazakhstani emigrants to Israel
Israeli Jews
Israeli footballers
Israeli people of Kazakhstani-Jewish descent
Kazakhstan Premier League players
Beitar Nes Tubruk F.C. players
Maccabi Ahi Nazareth F.C. players
Hapoel Petah Tikva F.C. players
FC Astana players
FC Kairat players
FC Tobol players
Israeli Premier League players
Kazakhstani footballers
Kazakhstan international footballers
Kazakhstani expatriate footballers
Association football defenders
Sportspeople from Almaty
Jewish Kazakhstani sportspeople